Best of Ballads & Blues is a greatest hits compilation album from the American hard rock band Poison. It was released August 5, 2003 on Capitol Records.

Content
Unlike Poison's Greatest Hits: 1986-1996, this compilation focuses on the group's power ballads and blues-oriented songs and also includes two acoustic recordings of "Something to Believe In" (#2 with new lyrics) and "Stand".

The compilation debuted at #141 on The Billboard 200 chart.

Selected versions of the album featured an exclusive bonus disc featuring 3 live tracks, which was also available as a promo single.

Track listing 
 "Every Rose Has Its Thorn" - (from the album Open Up and Say...Ahh!).
 "Something to Believe In" - (from the album Flesh & Blood).
 "Life Goes On" - (from the album Flesh & Blood).
 "I Won't Forget You" - (from the album Look What the Cat Dragged In).
 "Good Love" - (from the album Open Up and Say...Ahh!).
 "Lay Your Body Down" - (from the album Crack a Smile...and More!)
 "Until You Suffer Some (Fire and Ice)" - (from the album Native Tongue).
 "Be the One" - (from the album Crack a Smile...and More!).
 "Life Loves a Tragedy" - (from the album Flesh & Blood).
 "Only Time Will Tell" - (from the album Swallow This Live).
 "Poor Boy Blues" - (from the album Flesh & Blood).
 "Theatre of the Soul" - (from the album Native Tongue).
 "Bastard Son of a Thousand Blues" - (from the album Native Tongue).
 "The Last Song" - (from the album Power to the People).
 "Something to Believe In" # 2 (Acoustic Version Featuring New Lyrics) - (B-side of the single Life Goes On).
 "Stand" (Acoustic Version) - (B-side of the single Until You Suffer Some (Fire and Ice)).

Bonus live disc
 "Every Rose Has Its Thorn" - Live
 "Something to Believe In" - Live
 "Life Goes On" - Live

Personnel

 Bret Michaels - lead vocals
 Bobby Dall - bass guitar
 Rikki Rockett - drums
 C.C. DeVille - lead guitar on tracks 1 - 5, 9 - 11, 14 - 15
 Blues Saraceno - lead guitar on tracks 6, 8
 Richie Kotzen - lead guitar on tracks 7, 12 - 13, 16

Charts

References 

Poison (American band) compilation albums
2003 compilation albums